Committee on the District of Columbia may refer to:

 United States House Committee on Oversight and Government Reform, the successor committee to the United States House Committee on the District of Columbia
 United States Senate Committee on the District of Columbia
 Council of the District of Columbia, the legislature for the District of Columbia